Jacques De Wykerslooth De Rooyesteyn (8 July 1896 – 19 July 1988) was a Belgian modern pentathlete. He competed at the 1924 Summer Olympics.

References

External links
 

1896 births
1988 deaths
Belgian male modern pentathletes
Olympic modern pentathletes of Belgium
Modern pentathletes at the 1924 Summer Olympics
Sportspeople from Brussels